Anton Oleksandrovych Monakhov (born 31 January 1982) is a Russian and Ukrainian football defender who plays for TSK Simferopol.

Career
On 10 July 2009, he scored a tying goal for Ukraine in the final game against Italy at the 2009 Summer Universiade in Serbia.

Honours
Ukraine national team
2000 UEFA European Under-18 Football Championship: Runner-up
Football at the 2007 Summer Universiade: Champion
Football at the 2009 Summer Universiade: Champion
Tavriya Simferopol
2009–10 Ukrainian Cup: Winner
Kryvbas Kryvyi Rih
1999–2000 Ukrainian Cup: Finalist

External links
 
 

1982 births
Living people
Footballers from Zaporizhzhia
Ukrainian footballers
Association football defenders
Ukraine student international footballers
Ukraine youth international footballers
Ukrainian footballers banned from domestic competitions
Ukrainian expatriate footballers
Expatriate footballers in Russia
Expatriate footballers in Armenia
Ukrainian Premier League players
Ukrainian First League players
Ukrainian Second League players
Russian Premier League players
Armenian Premier League players
Ukrainian expatriate sportspeople in Russia
Ukrainian expatriate sportspeople in Armenia
Naturalised citizens of Russia
Ukrainian emigrants to Russia
Russian footballers
FC Metalurh-2 Zaporizhzhia players
FC Kryvbas Kryvyi Rih players
FC Kryvbas-2 Kryvyi Rih players
FC Spartak Moscow players
FC Moscow players
FC Elista players
FC Shakhtar-2 Donetsk players
FC Vorskla Poltava players
SC Tavriya Simferopol players
FC Krymteplytsia Molodizhne players
FC Naftovyk-Ukrnafta Okhtyrka players
FC Sevastopol players
FC Cherkashchyna players
FC Metalurh Zaporizhzhia players
FC Gandzasar Kapan players
FC TSK Simferopol players
Crimean Premier League players
Crimean Premier League managers
FC Krymteplytsia Molodizhne managers
Universiade gold medalists for Ukraine
Universiade medalists in football
Ukrainian football managers
Medalists at the 2007 Summer Universiade
Medalists at the 2009 Summer Universiade